A partial lunar eclipse took place on July 16, 1954.

Visibility

Related lunar eclipses

Lunar year series

Saros series
It was part of Saros series 138.

Half-Saros cycle
A lunar eclipse will be preceded and followed by solar eclipses by 9 years and 5.5 days (a half saros). This lunar eclipse is related to two total solar eclipses of Solar Saros 145.

Tritos series
 Preceded: Lunar eclipse of August 15, 1943
 Followed: Lunar eclipse of June 14, 1965

Tzolkinex
 Preceded: Lunar eclipse of June 3, 1947
 Followed: Lunar eclipse of August 26, 1961

See also
List of lunar eclipses
List of 20th-century lunar eclipses

Notes

External links

1954-07
1954 in science
July 1954 events